Sturla Snær Snorrason (born 1 March 1994) is an Icelandic alpine skier. He competed in the 2018 Winter Olympics.

References

1994 births
Living people
Alpine skiers at the 2018 Winter Olympics
Alpine skiers at the 2022 Winter Olympics
Icelandic male alpine skiers
Olympic alpine skiers of Iceland
21st-century Icelandic people